Freedom Comes High is a 1944 dramatic short film commissioned by the United States Government during World War II and directed by Lewis Allen.

Synopsis
The playlet involves a young woman coming home, tired, after a busy day at a war plant. Each time she comes in there is a letter from her husband overseas, and she remembers their conversations before he went off to war. She was concerned about him, because she felt it was a "young man's war" and he should stay home with her and the baby. However he was insistent that his country needed him. The plot then turns to the husband trying to manage his ship while it is being attacked by a submarine. The next day, the woman receives another letter from her husband, who is shown in double exposure, reminding her that freedom comes high, often at the price of human lives. The door bell rings, and it is a Western Union telegram, saying that her husband died.

The point of the film was to communicate to the American people that many of their sons and husbands who were going overseas, would not be coming back, and that they would have to understand they would be sacrificing their loved ones to secure freedom. Given the extraordinary sensitivity of the subject matter, the government short is notable both as propaganda and as a meditation on what has to be sacrificed for the maintenance of freedom.

Cast
 James Craig as Steve Blanding
 Barbara Britton as Ellen Blanding
 Donald Cook as The Captain
 Cecil Kellaway as Father
 Mabel Paige as Rhoda
 Charles Quigley as Jacobs

See also
List of Allied propaganda films of World War II

External links
 
 

1944 films
American World War II propaganda shorts
Films directed by Lewis Allen
American black-and-white films
American war drama films
1944 short films
1940s war drama films
1944 drama films
1940s English-language films
1940s American films